New York City's 3rd City Council district is one of 51 districts in the New York City Council. It is currently represented by Democrat Erik Bottcher, who took office in 2022. Notable former representatives include Council Speakers Corey Johnson and Christine Quinn.

Geography
District 3 covers the Lower Manhattan neighborhoods of Chelsea, the West Village, Hell's Kitchen, Hudson Square, the Garment District, Flatiron, and parts of Greenwich Village, Times Square, and the Upper West Side.

The district overlaps with Manhattan Community Boards 2, 4, 5, and 7, and with New York's 10th and 12th congressional districts. It also overlaps with the 26th, 27th, 28th and 31st districts of the New York State Senate, and with the 66th, 67th, and 75th districts of the New York State Assembly.

Chelsea and West Village, two of the district's main population centers, are both known as preeminent hubs for gay culture. Accordingly, the district has been represented by four consecutive gay councilmembers since 1992. The Stonewall Inn, considered to be the birthplace of gay rights in the United States, is located within the district.

Recent election results

2021
In 2019, voters in New York City approved Ballot Question 1, which implemented ranked-choice voting in all local elections. Under the new system, voters have the option to rank up to five candidates for every local office. Voters whose first-choice candidates fare poorly will have their votes redistributed to other candidates in their ranking until one candidate surpasses the 50 percent threshold. If one candidate surpasses 50 percent in first-choice votes, then ranked-choice tabulations will not occur. 

}}

2017

2013

Previous councilmembers
 Theodore S. Weiss (1966-1973)
 Miriam Friedlander (1974-1991)
 Carol Greitzer (1991)
 Thomas Duane (1992-1998)
 Christine Quinn (1999-2013)
 Corey Johnson (2014–2021)

References

New York City Council districts